Harles Daniel Bourdier (born 14 August 1972) is a retired Paraguayan international footballer. He played at the 1992 Summer Olympics and the 1997 Copa América for his native country. He also played club football for Club Olimpia.

International 
Bourdier made his international debut for the Paraguay national football team on 21 April 1996 in a friendly match against Bosnia and Herzegovina (3-0). He obtained a total number of 14 international caps, scoring one goal for the national side.

External links

1972 births
Living people
Paraguayan footballers
Paraguay international footballers
Footballers at the 1992 Summer Olympics
1997 Copa América players
Olympic footballers of Paraguay
Sportspeople from Asunción
Club Olimpia footballers
Association football midfielders